The Curtiss XP-46 was a 1940s American prototype fighter aircraft. It was a development of the Curtiss-Wright Corporation in an effort to introduce the best features found in European fighter aircraft in 1939 into a fighter aircraft which could succeed the Curtiss P-40, then in production.

Design and development
A United States Army Air Corps (USAAC) specification based upon a Curtiss proposal was the basis for an order placed in September 1939 for the XP-46. The requirements called for a single-engine, low-wing aircraft, slightly smaller than the P-40, and with a wide-track, inward-retracting landing gear. The selected powerplant was a 1,150 hp (858 kW) Allison V-1710-39 V-12 engine. The planned armament included two .50 in (12.7 mm) synchronized machine guns in the forward fuselage and provisions for eight .30 in (7.62 mm) wing-mounted guns. The USAAC later added requirements for self-sealing fuel tanks and 65 lb (29 kg) of armor, the weights of which were to adversely affect performance.

Testing
In 1940 the British Purchasing Commission placed an order for the P-46 as a replacement for the P-40, the name 'Kittyhawk' being allocated by the Air Ministry in anticipation of receiving the aircraft.

However, the USAAC asked Curtiss in July 1940 – while the XP-46 prototypes were under construction – to prioritize an upgraded P-40, featuring the engine intended for the XP-46. This would also avoid disruptions to the production line caused by any switch to a new airframe. The British order for the P-46 was later cancelled, and the 'Kittyhawk' name subsequently applied to the upgraded P-40.

Two prototypes, designated XP-46A, were nevertheless delivered to the USAAC; the first flight occurred on 15 February 1941. The type's performance during trials was found to be inferior to the then-contemporary P-40D. As the P-46 offered no significant improvement on the P-40, the program was cancelled. 

A myth claims that work on the XP-46 was the basis of the North American NA-73X – the prototype P-51 Mustang. While North American Aviation (NAA) purchased technical aerodynamic data on the P-40 and XP-46 from Curtiss for $56,000, and there are certain design similarities in the radiator/oil-cooler configuration of the two types, North American had already made significant progress on its design.

Specifications (Curtiss XP-46A)

See also
 Curtiss P-40
 Curtiss XP-42 - an earlier design also intended to replace the P-40, but not put into production
 North American P-51 Mustang
 Curtiss XP-53/YP-60 – a series of designs developed from the XP-46

References

Notes

Bibliography

 Berliner, Don. Surviving Fighter Aircraft of World War Two: Fighters. London: Pen & Sword Aviation, 2011. .
 Bowers, Peter M. Curtiss Aircraft, 1907-1947. London: Putnam & Company Ltd., 1979. .
 Green, William. War Planes of the Second World War, Volume Four: Fighters. London: MacDonald & Co. (Publishers) Ltd., 1961 (Sixth impression 1969). .
 Green, William and Gordon Swanborough. WW2 Aircraft Fact Files: US Army Air Force Fighters, Part 1. London: Macdonald and Jane's Publishers Ltd., 1977. .

External links

 Curtiss XP-46

Curtiss P-46
P-46
Single-engined tractor aircraft
Low-wing aircraft
Aircraft first flown in 1941